The Alp Arslan National Drama Theatre of Turkmenistan, known as the Alp Arslan National Youth Theatre of Turkmenistan until 2015, is located on Archabil avenue of Ashgabat.

History 
In the past, the theatre was sited in a former cinema building.

In 2006, the theatre relocated to a new four-storey, building in the south of Ashgabat. It was built by Turkish company GAP Insaat and inaugurated on 21 October 2006. The theatre walls are lined with Italian marble, the facade is decorated with tall columns and stained glass windows. The building has four elevators. The theatre scene has two spinning halls with 800 and 200 seats. The area of the main stage is more than 400 square metres. On the square in front of the theatre is a monument to Turkmen ruler Alp Arslan. The cost of the building was $17 million.

References

Links 
 About the theatre

Theatres in Ashgabat
Theatres completed in 2006